This article is about the particular significance of the year 1738 to Wales and its people.

Incumbents
Lord Lieutenant of North Wales (Lord Lieutenant of Anglesey, Caernarvonshire, Flintshire, Merionethshire, Montgomeryshire) – George Cholmondeley, 3rd Earl of Cholmondeley 
Lord Lieutenant of Glamorgan – Charles Powlett, 3rd Duke of Bolton
Lord Lieutenant of Brecknockshire and Lord Lieutenant of Monmouthshire – Thomas Morgan
Lord Lieutenant of Cardiganshire – John Vaughan, 2nd Viscount Lisburne
Lord Lieutenant of Carmarthenshire – vacant until 1755
Lord Lieutenant of Denbighshire – Sir Robert Salusbury Cotton, 3rd Baronet 
Lord Lieutenant of Pembrokeshire – Sir Arthur Owen, 3rd Baronet
Lord Lieutenant of Radnorshire – James Brydges, 1st Duke of Chandos

Bishop of Bangor – Thomas Herring (from 15 January) 
Bishop of Llandaff – John Harris (until 28 August) 
Bishop of St Asaph – Isaac Maddox
Bishop of St Davids – Nicholas Clagett

Events
March - Howel Harris preaches in Monmouthshire for the first time.
14 May - John Wesley hears William Holland read from the work of Martin Luther, occasioning his own conversion.
May - The Bala Eisteddfod takes place, chaired by Edward Wynne. Ellis Cadwaladr is winner of the bardic chair.
unknown dates
A new building, designed by James Steer to house the Welsh Charity School is erected in London.
A Baptist church is founded at Welsh Neck in South Carolina, United States.
Morgan Edwards begins his career as a preacher.
Lawyer John Meredith is knighted and becomes High Sheriff of Brecknock.

Arts and literature

New books

English language
Anne Penny - Select Poems from Mr. Gesner's Pastorals

Welsh language
Newyddion Mawr Oddiwrth y Ser

Music
William Williams Pantycelyn - Caniadau … y Môr o Wydr

Births
4 June - Prince George, eldest son of the Prince and Princess of Wales (died 1820)
September (in Ireland) - Francis Mathew, 1st Earl Landaff (died 1806)
date unknown - David Williams, philosopher (died 1816)

Deaths
January - Thomas Harley (of Kinsham), former MP for Radnorshire, about 63
12 June - Samuel Edwards, politician, about 70
28 August - John Harris, Bishop of Llandaff, 58
1 September - Mathias Maurice, minister and author, 54
27 September - Sir Thomas Stradling, 6th Baronet, 28 (in a duel)

References

1738 by country
1738 in Great Britain